The Malaysia women's national volleyball team represents Malaysia in international women's volleyball competitions and friendly matches.

They had their best year when they qualified for the 1987 Asian Women's Volleyball Championship.

Results

Southeast Asian Games

 Champions   Runners up   Third place   Fourth place

References

National women's volleyball teams
Volleyball
Volleyball in Malaysia